William of Paris, O.P., (died 1314), Dominican priest and theologian.

William composed the Diologus de Septem Sacramentis at the Priory of St. Jacques in Paris between 1310 and 1314.

He was confessor of Philip IV of France.

He was made inquisitor of France in 1303, and began a campaign against the Templars in 1307. The arrest of the Templars led Pope Clement V to suspend William's powers after a complaint from Edward II of England, but King Phillip's "bold and comtemptuous" written reply caused the Pope to back down and re-instate William.

In 1310 he presided over the trial of Marguerite Porete.

References

Inquisitors
French Dominicans
Knights Templar
Archbishops of Sens
14th-century Roman Catholic archbishops in France
13th-century births
1314 deaths
Year of birth unknown